The Bullit World Darts Trophy was a professional darts tournament run by the British Darts Organisation and the World Darts Federation. Held each September from 2002 to 2007, it took place at the De Vechtsebanen in Utrecht, Netherlands. The tournament had a playing format comparable with the two World Championships (BDO and PDC). Until 2007, it formed the third leg of the BDO Grand Slam, along with the BDO World Championship, the World Masters and the International Darts League.

Tournament history 

First held in 2002, the tournament was played under the auspices of the World Darts Federation, British Darts Organisation and the Dutch Darts Association (NDB, the Dutch governing body of darts) and featured players from those organisations up to and including 2005.

PDC Participation 
However, in 2006, following Raymond van Barneveld's move to the PDC in February of that year, host broadcasters SBS 6, were able to grant invitations to five non-WDF affiliated players, meaning that players from the PDC would be able to compete in the event for the first time. Van Barneveld, along with Phil Taylor, Colin Lloyd, Ronnie Baxter and Peter Manley were given the five invitations that were offered to the PDC.

In 2007, the WDT included the top 12 players in the PDC Order of Merit and four PDC Qualifiers, giving a total of 16 PDC players who would line up alongside 12 from the WDF rankings and 4 wildcards, which were given to Jelle Klaasen, Michael van Gerwen, Vincent van der Voort and Mervyn King, all of whom had left the BDO to join the PDC earlier that year.

End of event 
Towards the end of 2007, the chairman of the PDC, Barry Hearn, announced that its players would not be competing in the 2008 International Darts League and World Darts Trophy events. As a result, SBS6 announced they would no longer be broadcasting the event, with their coverage relying heavily on big names such as van Barneveld, which then cast doubts over whether either tournament would go ahead.

The tournament promoters filed a lawsuit against the PDC and SBS6 claiming a contract had been agreed for the PDC players to be involved. The case ended in failure on 21 February 2008, and the International Darts League was indefinitely postponed. The future of the World Darts Trophy was also thrown into doubt as a result of the decision, and both events were confirmed defunct by the failure of an appeal on 29 April 2008.

Sponsors 
2004–2006 Bavaria (Premium Dutch beer)
2007 Bullit (Energy drink)

Prize Fund
Winner	€45,000	
Runner Up  €22,500
Joint 3rd 2 x €11,250	
Joint 5th 4 x €6,000	
Joint 9th 8 x €3,000	
Joint 17th 16 x €2,000
Joint 33rd and 41st 24 x €1,000	
Totals	€194,000

Final results and statistics

Men's Finals

Women's finals

Junior WDT finals

References

External links 
World Darts Trophy Darts Mad.

 
2002 establishments in the Netherlands
2007 disestablishments in the Netherlands
Professional Darts Corporation tournaments
British Darts Organisation tournaments
Darts in the Netherlands
International sports competitions hosted by the Netherlands